"Four Sticks" is a song by the English rock band Led Zeppelin from their untitled fourth album. The title reflects drummer John Bonham's performance with two sets of two drumsticks, totaling four.

The song was difficult to record, and required more takes than usual. John Paul Jones played a VCS3 synthesizer on the track.  The song has an unusual time signature, featuring riffs in a mixture of 5/8 and 6/8.

Only one live performance has been identified – in Copenhagen on their 1971 European tour – and preserved on some bootleg recordings.

Four Hands
The song was re-recorded by Jimmy Page and Robert Plant with the Bombay Symphony Orchestra in 1972, during their trip to India, along with another song, "Friends" from Led Zeppelin III. This version featured tabla drums and sitars. The recording, titled "Four Hands" was released officially on the 2015 remastering of Coda.

See also
List of cover versions of Led Zeppelin songs"Four Sticks" entries

References

Led Zeppelin songs
Songs written by Jimmy Page
Songs written by Robert Plant
1972 singles
Song recordings produced by Jimmy Page
Atlantic Records singles
1971 songs
Raga rock songs